Group 3 of the 1930 FIFA World Cup began on 14 July 1930 and concluded on 21 July 1930. Uruguay won the group, and advanced to the semi-finals. Romania and Peru failed to advance.

Standings

Matches

Romania vs Peru
{{#invoke:transcludable section|main|section=3-1|text={{football box
|date = 14 July 1930
|time = 14:50 UYT (UTC−03:30)
|team1 = 
|score = 3–1
|report =Report
|team2 = 
|goals1 = Deşu Stanciu Kovács |goals2 = De Souza 
|stadium = Estadio Pocitos, Montevideo
|attendance = 2,549
|referee = Alberto Warnken (Chile)
}}}}

|
|valign="top" width="50%"|

|}

Uruguay vs Peru

|
|valign="top" width="50%"|

|}

Uruguay vs Romania
{{#invoke:transcludable section|main|section=3-3|text={{football box
|date = 21 July 1930
|time = 14:50 UYT (UTC−03:30)
|team1 = 
|score = 4–0
|report = Report
|team2 = 
|goals1 = Dorado Scarone Anselmo Cea |stadium = Estadio Centenario, Montevideo
|attendance = 70,022
|referee = Almeida Rêgo (Brazil)
}}}}

|
|valign="top" width="50%"|

|}

References

Group 3
Group
Group
Group